Andrea Manici (born 28 April 1990) is an Italian rugby union player who plays as a Hooker.  He currently plays for Zebre in the Pro14.

In May 2013, Manici was called up by the Italian national rugby union team for the South African Quadrangular Tournament. On 22 June, he made his debut against Samoa.

References

External links
 http://www.itsrugby.co.uk/player-16265.html

1990 births
Living people
Italian rugby union players
Italy international rugby union players
Zebre Parma players
Sportspeople from Parma
Rugby union hookers